Lasioceros is a genus of moths in the family Erebidae. The genus was erected by George Thomas Bethune-Baker in 1904.

Species
Lasioceros aroa Bethune-Baker, 1904
Lasioceros dentilinea Joicey & Talbot, 1918

References

Calpinae
Noctuoidea genera